Robert "Bob" La Castra (born in England)  is an Australian local politician who was a popular children's television show presenter in the 1980s, best known for hosting the children's show Wombat and the game show Big Square Eye. He went on to write for ABC Television's Bananas in Pyjamas with his production company Little Production House.

He also played Eddie Buckingham in the Network Ten soap opera Neighbours in 1990.

La Castra is currently a City of Gold Coast councillor, first elected in 1997.

References

External links
Little Production House
 

1960 births
Living people
Queensland local councillors
Australian television presenters
Australian television writers
Australian male television actors
Australian male television writers
English emigrants to Australia